Girondins de Bordeaux Superleague Formula team was the racing team of FC Girondins de Bordeaux, a football team that competes in France in Ligue 1. The Girondins de Bordeaux racing team competed in the Superleague Formula. It was operated by Barazi-Epsilon for their debut season in 2010, the car itself was driven by Franck Montagny. In 2011, it was driven by Tristan Gommendy until the series collapsed.

Record
(key)

2010

Gallery

References

External links
 GD Bordeaux Superleague Formula team minisite
 Official GD Bordeaux football club website

FC Girondins de Bordeaux
Superleague Formula club teams
2010 establishments in France